This is a list of seasons completed by the Houston Cougars men's basketball team.

Seasons

References 

Houston Cougars
 
Houston Cougars men's basketball seasons
Houston Cougars basketball seasons